Tapinoma krakatauae is a species of ant in the genus Tapinoma. Described by William Morton Wheeler in 1924, the species is endemic to Indonesia.

References

Tapinoma
Hymenoptera of Asia
Insects of Indonesia
Insects described in 1924